The International School of Hamburg, known to the school community as ISH, is a private international school in the West of Hamburg. ISH combines the IPC (age 3-10), the IB Middle Years Programme (MYP) (age 11-16), the IB Career Related Programme (CP) (Age 16-19), and the IB Diploma Programme (age 17-19).
The International School of Hamburg was founded in 1957 as the first international school in Germany. ISH is a non-profit organization and remains the only Council of International Schools-accredited organisation in Hamburg. In 2010, ISH moved to its current, purpose-built campus, at Hemmingstedter Weg in Hamburg-Osdorf. An extensive expansion was built in 2015.
The school currently has a combined enrolment of approximately 760 students aged 3 to 19 from over 55 countries.

History and facilities
ISH was founded in 1957 as a British Army School with 50 students from 12 nations in the house of the U.S. Consul C. H. Timberlake. By 1959, the school moved to Waitzstrasse in Hamburg-Othmarschen with an enrollment of 360 students. ISH moved to Holmbrook in Othmarschen in 1973, and in 1978 it became an IB World School, offering the IB Diploma Programme and later on began offering the IB Career-Related Programme. In January 2010, ISH moved to its current, purpose-built campus, at Hemmingstedter Weg in Hamburg-Osdorf. An extensive expansion was built in 2015 including three state-of-the-art sports halls, fitness gym, outdoor soccer pitch, two outdoor playgrounds, a 400-seat auditorium and an extensive library. With 41,000sqm of school grounds and 19,000sqm of building ground surface, ISH possesses plenty of space for approximately 900 students. The architects have designed buildings that offer a quiet ambiance for the education of pupils of different nations and cultures.

ISH is the only school in Hamburg that offers the IPC, and was Hamburg's first school to offer the IB Middle Years Programme (MYP) in 2013.

Accreditations
The International School of Hamburg is an IPC School and an IB World School. It is accredited by the New England Association of Schools and Colleges (NEASC) and the Council of International Schools (CIS).
ISH is an active member of the European Council of International Schools (ECIS) and the Northwest European Council of International Schools (NECIS). ISH is also a member of the Association of German International Schools (AGIS).

Extracurricular activities
The Extra-Curricular Activities Programme (ECAP) at ISH offers four strands of after-school student activities: Sports (Intramural & NECIS), Performing Arts, Visual Arts and Special Interests.

Sports: Intramural & NECIS: The intramural sports programme is designed for younger students (students in grades P1 to 4 who are too young to join the NECIS Sports programme); and for those older students (grades 5 to 12) who do not wish to commit to a NECIS team (or in addition to) but instead prefer to play recreational sports in a non-competitive environment.

Performing Arts at ISH is divided into Drama/Theatre, Music, and Dance.
The ISH Music Enrichment Programme (MEP), founded in 2004, offers music instruction, both individual and ensemble, on the school premises to students in grades 1 to 12, as well as individual and group instruction on the following instruments: violin, viola, cello, flute, clarinet, saxophone, trumpet, French horn, trombone, guitar, bass, piano, drums/percussion and voice.

A wide range of Special Interests include the Chess Club, The Yearbook Production Team, The Model United Nations and Debating Society, and more.

The Mother Tongue Programme supports students who cannot be provided with formal tuition in their mother tongue during school hours.

References

External links 
 Official ISH Website

International schools in Hamburg
Buildings and structures in Altona, Hamburg
International Baccalaureate schools in Germany
Educational institutions established in 1957
Private schools in Germany
1957 establishments in West Germany